Forest Fletcher (April 27, 1888 – November 27, 1945) was born in Lincoln, Nebraska and died in Lexington, Virginia.

Raised in Chicago, Fletcher attended the University of Notre Dame with his boyhood friend, legendary football player and coach Knute Rockne, with whom he shared Norwegian descent.  As a track and field athlete, Fletcher competed in the 1912 Summer Olympics in Stockholm, Sweden, finishing seventh men's standing high jump and ninth in the men's standing long jump.  After college, he taught in Cedar City, Utah and Mitchell, South Dakota before being hired by Washington & Lee University where he served as cross country and track coach and athletic director.  During World War I, he organized students to serve with him in France with a medical ambulance unit.  In 1936 he accompanied the US track and field team that included the great Jesse Owens to the Berlin Olympics.

Personal life 
Married to Laura Powell Tucker (1892-1986) of Lexington, Virginia, he was the father of Rosa Fletcher Crocker, Henrietta Fletcher Horan, and Forest Fletcher.

References

External links

1888 births
1945 deaths
American male high jumpers
American male long jumpers
Olympic track and field athletes of the United States
Athletes (track and field) at the 1912 Summer Olympics
University of Notre Dame alumni
People from Lexington, Virginia
Washington and Lee University faculty